Minuartia obtusiloba is a perennial alpine herb known by the common names alpine sandwort and twinflower stitchwort. It is native to the mountains of western North America from the High Sierra of California to the Colorado Rockies north to Alaska. Its range may extend into far eastern Russia. This is a low plant forming mats or clumps and bearing small thimble-shaped flowers with curving white petals.

External links
Jepson Manual Treatment
USDA Plants Profile
Flora of North America
Photo gallery

obtusiloba
Alpine flora
Flora of Alaska
Flora of British Columbia
Flora of California
Flora of the Rocky Mountains
Flora of the Sierra Nevada (United States)
Flora of the Western United States
Flora without expected TNC conservation status